"We Are Family" is a song recorded by American vocal group Sister Sledge. Composed by Bernard Edwards and Nile Rodgers, they both offered the song to Atlantic Records; although the record label initially declined, the track was released in April 1979 as a single from the album of the same name (1979) and began to gain club and radio play, eventually becoming the group's signature song.

"We Are Family" went gold, becoming the number one R&B and number two pop song on the American charts in 1979 (behind "Hot Stuff" by Donna Summer). Along with the tracks "He's the Greatest Dancer" and "Lost in Music", "We Are Family" reached number one on the Billboard Dance Club Songs. It has been re-released two times in new remixes; in 1984 and 1993. In 2017, the song was selected for preservation in the National Recording Registry by the Library of Congress as being "culturally, historically, or artistically significant." Billboard magazine named the song number 20 on their list of "100 Greatest Girl Group Songs of All Time" same year.

Origins and meaning
"We Are Family" was the first song that Nile Rodgers and Bernard Edwards wrote for any act other than their own band Chic. After their first hit, "Dance, Dance, Dance (Yowsah, Yowsah, Yowsah)", Atlantic Records President Jerry L. Greenberg wanted the pair to write and produce for other acts on the label; Rodgers and Edwards did not feel confident enough to work with big, established recording artists and performers, e.g.: The Rolling Stones, Bette Midler, etc. They also felt that if they worked as Greenberg had suggested, credit for a hit would just go to those established people, and Rodgers/Edwards would not gain proper notice as songwriter/producers. So the pair suggested that they write and produce a song for the label's least established act; if they got a hit record, then they could take the challenge of writing for someone bigger.

According to Rodgers, the verses were mostly verbatim based on how Greenberg described Sister Sledge to them when first commissioning the work. Rodgers/Edwards then simply walked immediately to the studio, rearranged their notes from the meeting into lyrics, and wrote a song melody underneath them. The chorus (and therefore the title) makes reference to the fact that the group are the four sisters of a family.

The song has since gone on to be used more generally as an expression of solidarity in various contexts, notably as the anthem of the We Are Family Foundation, which is named after it. The lead vocals to "We Are Family" were recorded in a single take by then-19-year-old Kathy Sledge. 

"We Are Family" became the rally song of the 1979 World Series Champion Pittsburgh Pirates as the Pirates came from behind to win.

Critical reception

Original version
Cash Box said that "We Are Family" has "caressing, exuberant lead vocals backed by Sister Sledge's infectious harmony vocals." Billboard said it has "an upbeat, catchy melody" and "heavy bass, funky guitar and pulsating percussion."

1993 remix
In his weekly UK chart commentary, James Masterton wrote, "Your eyes do not deceive you. at a time when the 1970s are suddenly hip again, one of the best soul disco records ever made return in a new set of mixes for 1993." Alan Jones from Music Week stated that the song "gets a new treatment from the Sure Is Pure dream team. The result, while less dinstinctive than the original with much of Chic's sterling instrumental work suppressed, is a hot and contemporary garage track." Another editor, Andy Beevers, named it Pick of the Week in the category of Dance, adding, "This most enduring and endearing of club classics should make the Top 40 for the third time thanks to a wonderful and suitably reverential remix by Sure Is Pure."

Music video
A music video was filmed in 1979 to promote the single, featuring the group wearing red outfits and dancing to the song in a street-like setting. It was later published on YouTube in December 2013. The video had generated more than 6.4 million views as of January 2023.

Impact and legacy
Billboard magazine ranked "We Are Family" number 18 in their list of "The 35 Best Disco Songs Ever" in 2016 and number 20 in their list of "100 Greatest Girl Group Songs of All Time" in 2017. Rolling Stone ranked it number 34 in their list of "200 Greatest Dance Songs of All Time" in 2022.

Charts

Weekly charts

Year-end charts

Certifications and sales

Cover versions
Many artists have covered the song. Among the more notable versions is one by Babes in Toyland, which was a dance club hit in the U.S. It peaked at number 22 on the Billboard Hot Dance Music/Club Play chart in 1995. In addition, Nile Rodgers organized a re-recording of the song in 2001 as a benefit record for the September 11 attacks. This in turn led to his co-creation of the We Are Family Foundation, a global charity named for the song and designed to inspire and educate young people to find solutions to problems such as hunger and illiteracy that impede world peace.

Rodgers also produced a version featuring characters from popular television shows from PBS Kids, Nickelodeon and Disney such as Sesame Street, Between the Lions, Bear in the Big Blue House, Barney & Friends, etc. This version aired on Disney Channel, Playhouse Disney, Nickelodeon, Nick Jr. and PBS Kids on March 11, 2002 and subsequently was commercially released on DVD in 2005 as a public service announcement to promote diversity and tolerance, but it was attacked by an evangelical group which felt that SpongeBob SquarePants promoted homosexuality. In December 2007, the song was announced as one of the 2008 inductees to the Grammy Hall of Fame.

Australian singer Samantha Jade recorded a cover version of the song, which was played in the 2020 Robert Zemeckis film The Witches.

The song appears in 2021's Coming 2 America film, played by the fictional band Sexual Chocolate and sung by Eddie Murphy as Randy Watson.

The song appears repeatedly, from the opening to the closing, of the 1996 hit feel-good comedy movie The Birdcage, set in South Florida's South Beach Art Deco District, with the main characters (played by Robin Williams, Gene Hackman, Dianne Wiest, Calista Flockhart, Nathan Lane, Hank Azaria, Dan Futterman, Tom McGowan, and Christine Baranski), and the entire Birdcage cast and audience, some in drag, singing and dancing to the number.

References

External links
 [ AllMusic entry]
 [ AllMusicguide.com]
 

1979 singles
1984 singles
1993 singles
1979 songs
Babes in Toyland (band) songs
Cotillion Records singles
Disco songs
Grammy Hall of Fame Award recipients
Music Week number-one dance singles
Pittsburgh Pirates
RPM Top Singles number-one singles
Sister Sledge songs
Song recordings produced by Nile Rodgers
Songs about families
Songs written by Bernard Edwards
Songs written by Nile Rodgers
United States National Recording Registry recordings